Kochu Road is a small village in Kottayam district of Kerala state in India.  Kochu Road falls under Madapally Panchayat and Chanaganacherry Thaluk. The village is situated 10 km away from Changanacherry town.  The  landscape includes rubber plantations, paddy fields, coconut trees, pepper and a wide variety of plants and trees.
Lourde Matha Church is a notable Christian Catholic Church nearby. Also of note is Madapally Bhagavathi (Goddess) Temple.

References

Villages in Kottayam district

Panchayat : Madappally
Ward : 6
Panchayath member : Nideesh kocherry 9846599143
Famous person : Johny Antony ( Film Director)
Travel agency : Happyholidaysinn